North Penn High School is a part of the North Penn School District and is located in Towamencin Township, Pennsylvania, about a mile outside of Lansdale borough, 25 miles northwest of Philadelphia, along Valley Forge Road (Pennsylvania Route 363).

North Penn High School was created in 1955 as the result of a consolidation of seven school districts (Hatfield Joint Consolidated, Lansdale Borough, Line Lexington Independent, Montgomery Township, North Wales Borough, Towamencin Township and Upper Gwynedd Township) to educate students from three former high schools: Hatfield High School, Lansdale High School, and North Wales High School.  The original North Penn High School building was an expansion of the building that had served as Lansdale High School since the 1930s.  The former Hatfield and North Wales buildings were eventually converted to elementary schools. The North Wales building is still used for this purpose today. The Hatfield building, later renamed the E.B. Laudenslager Elementary School, was replaced by a newer building in 1971.  The current North Penn High School was constructed in 1971 because of severe overcrowding at the original school. The former high school building, located on Penn Street in Lansdale, is now Penndale Middle School.

North Penn High School is among the largest statewide, with student enrollment for the 2005–2006 school year at 3,423.
Sophomores, juniors, and seniors are represented at the high school. Freshmen, although commonly the first year of high school, only occasionally attend certain classes, and are regularly enrolled in one of these three middle schools: Penndale Middle School, Pennbrook Middle School, and Pennfield Middle School. The middle schools enroll grades 7–9, while the elementary schools enroll grades K–6.

Sports
In 2005, 2006, and 2007 Sports Illustrated distinguished North Penn as having the best athletic program in Pennsylvania, noting that the school has "won 45 state championships over the last 10 years" and "is a power in football and is also dominant in boys' swimming." The school is also prominent in boys' and girls' water polo, and boys' winter track, spring track, cross country, and more recently baseball and softball.

.

Notable alumni 

John Oates (Class of 1966) – Member of the musical duo Hall & Oates
Jay Caufield (Class of 1979) – Retired NHL right winger. Stanley Cup winner with the Pittsburgh Penguins in the 1991–1992 season
Jennifer Strong (class of 1991) – soccer player, made an appearance on the United States women's national soccer team.
Sean McDermott - head coach of NFL's Buffalo Bills (did not graduate, transferred to La Salle College High School)
Liza Weil (Class of 1995) – Television, film, and theater actress, Paris Geller on Gilmore Girls and Bonnie Winterbottom on How to Get Away with Murder
Sharon Little (Class of 1998) singer-songwriter signed to CBS Records. Debut album "Perfect Time For A Breakdown" sold 20,000+ copies. Performed on national tour with Robert Plant, Alison Krauss and T Bone Burnett.
Andrew Bryniarski – Film and television actor. Appeared as Leatherface in the 2003 remake of The Texas Chainsaw Massacre
Steve Malagari (Class of 2002) – Current state representative for the Pennsylvania House of Representatives, District 53
Dan "Soupy" Campbell (Class of 2004) – lead vocalist of rock band The Wonder Years
Matt Brasch (Class of 2004) – guitarist of rock band The Wonder Years
Nick Steinborn (Class of 2004) – guitarist of rock band The Wonder Years
Edwin Kneedler – Deputy Solicitor General of the United States; has argued more United States Supreme Court cases than any other person living
Brandon McManus (Class of 2009) – Placekicker for the Denver Broncos. Holds several Temple career records, including points scored (338).
Elizabeth Mencel (Class of 2011) – Better known by her stage name Rozes. American musician, singer and songwriter featured on The Chainsmokers' 2015 hit, "Roses".
Matt Ammendola (Class of 2015) – NFL Placekicker, most recently played for the Arizona Cardinals.

Notes and references

External links
 North Penn High School Website

Public high schools in Pennsylvania
Eastern Pennsylvania Rugby Union
Lansdale, Pennsylvania
Educational institutions established in 1955
Schools in Montgomery County, Pennsylvania
1955 establishments in Pennsylvania
School buildings completed in 1971